Gaëtane Iza Laure Thiney (born 28 October 1985) is a French professional footballer who plays for Division 1 Féminine club Paris FC. Primarily a midfielder, she can also play as a striker.

Thiney is also a member of the France national team, making her first major tournament appearance with her nation at UEFA Women's Euro 2009. She is a two-time winner of the Division 1 Féminine player of the year award.

Early career
Thiney began her career playing for ASS Brienne-le-Château in the commune of Brienne-le-Château, which is 26 miles northeast of her hometown Troyes. After a stint in the youth system, she moved a few miles north to Olympique Saint-Memmie, who were playing in the first division of French women's football. She made her league debut with Saint-Memmie during the 2000–01 season. Thiney spent six seasons at the club and, following the 2005–06 season, secured a moved to US Compiègne Oise in Compiègne. In her first season with the club, she appeared in 21 matches and scored five goals. Unfortunately, Compiègne suffered relegation to the second division. Thiney spent her final season with the club in D2 Féminine and was easily the best player in the team appearing in 18 matches and scoring a team-leading 20 goals.

Juvisy
Thiney's successful play earned her a call up to the national team and also a move to top-tier club FCF Juvisy. In Thiney's first season with Juvisy, she appeared in 21 matches and scored seven goals helping Juvisy finish in 3rd position, one point shy of qualifying for the newly created UEFA Women's Champions League. In the 2009–10 season, Thiney remained potent on the field scoring nine goals helping Juvisy finish runner-up to Lyon in the league, which inserted the club into the 2010–11 edition of the UEFA Women's Champions League. In the competition, she scored a goal in the first qualifying round against Estonian club Levadia Tallinn in a 12–0 win. After contributing to Juvisy reaching the knockout stage, Thiney increased her contribution by scoring a goal in each leg of the team's 9–0 aggregate victory over Icelandic club Breiðablik in the Round of 32. Juvisy ultimately suffered elimination in the competition at the hands of the defending champions Turbine Potsdam. In league play, Thiney converted 11 goals, second-best on the team behind lead striker Laëtitia Tonazzi. Juvisy, however, finished the season in a disappointing 4th place.

International career

Thiney made her international debut on 28 February 2007 in a 2–0 victory over China. During qualification for the UEFA Women's Euro 2009, she scored two goals against Slovenia and Serbia. In the tournament, she scored her only goal in France's 1–5 group stage defeat to the eventual champions Germany. France reached as far as the quarterfinals losing to the Netherlands 4–5 on penalties. On 28 October 2009, Thiney scored her first career hat trick in a 2011 FIFA Women's World Cup qualification match against Estonia in a 12–0 victory. Thiney finished the qualification campaign with a team-high 12 goals, including a goal in the team's 3–2 second leg World Cup playoff victory over Italy, which allowed France qualification to the competition.

At the World Cup, Thiney was the decisive player in the team's second group stage match against Canada scoring a double in a 4–0 win. The victory allowed France progression to the knockout stage portion of the competition.

Career statistics

Club
''Statistics accurate as of 26 July 2022.

International

International goals

Honours
France
UEFA Women's Under-19 Championship: 2003
Cyprus Cup: 2012, 2014
SheBelieves Cup: 2017
Individual
 UEFA Women's Championship All-Star Team: 2013

Notes

See also
 List of women's footballers with 100 or more caps

References

External links

 
 
  

1985 births
Living people
French women's footballers
France women's international footballers
Sportspeople from Troyes
Paris FC (women) players
2011 FIFA Women's World Cup players
2015 FIFA Women's World Cup players
Footballers at the 2012 Summer Olympics
Olympic footballers of France
FIFA Century Club
Women's association football midfielders
Women's association football forwards
Division 1 Féminine players
Footballers from Grand Est
2019 FIFA Women's World Cup players
National Women's Soccer League players
French expatriate women's footballers
Expatriate women's soccer players in the United States
French expatriate sportspeople in the United States
UEFA Women's Euro 2017 players